The Nike CTR360 is a line of association football boots manufactured by Nike.

History
In October 2009, Nike released the CTR360 Maestri, when they were debuted on the pitch by Cesc Fàbregas. The name was meant to reference the Italian for "master". The CTR360 Maestri was created to complement the existing Nike lines of the Tiempo Legend, Total 90 Laser and Mercurial Vapor. While the Laser and Vapor are designed for the premier striker, the CTR was created for the playmaking midfielder. Upon its launch, the CTR360 was worn by many top football players, such as Andrés Iniesta, Mario Balotelli, Javier Mascherano, Sergio Busquets, Florent Malouda and Alex Song.

Many of the features built into the CTR360 Maestri, were developed to assist players with receiving and distributing the ball, such as dampening pods on the forefoot, and asymmetrical lacing to increase the amount of contact with the ball. To aid distribution, there is a rubberized pass pad on the instep along with memory foam to create a more uniform surface. In order to help improve the player's first touch, Nike developed a new synthetic leather for the boot, called KANGA-LITE. KANGA-LITE is water resistant, similar to other synthetic leathers, but has better ball feel and touch.

The launch of the CTR featured two colorways, Black/Red/White and White/Yellow/Black. Subsequent colorways were White/Royal/Silver/Black/Retro, White/Maroon/Gold, White/Cyber/Black and Black/White/Blue. The CTR360 is available in five different outsoles, FG - firm ground, SG - soft ground, AG - artificial grass, TF - turf and IC - indoor.

CTR360 Maestri II
In December 2010, Cesc Fàbregas again debuted the new CTR on the pitch against rivals Manchester United. The CTR360 Maestri II was designed to build upon the success of its predecessor while making improvements where necessary. The dampening pods on the forefoot were retained, although they were made larger to offer greater control. On the instep, the control pads have gained a fin-like design, similar to that of the T90 Laser III, for added traction. The memory foam on the instep was replaced by a pass and receive pad featuring grip-like traction, inspired by a golf putter.
The CTR360 Maestri II is available in the same five outsoles as the original. The debut colorway for the boot was Red/White/Black, followed by White/Black/Blue, White/Black/Yellow, Black/White/Red, Platinum/Blue/Black and the current White/Silver/Purple. Nike have also come out with the "clash collection" which provided a new colour way  White/Blue/black.

First two color releases in 2012 for the Nike CTR360 Maestri II is Dark Shadow/Volt and Loyal Blue.

Elite Series
In anticipation of the 2010 World Cup in South Africa, Nike released the Elite Series of football boots. The goal was to create faster versions of their shoes, without compromising their most important qualities. In order to reduce the weight of the CTR, a carbon fiber outsole was added which made the boot 19% lighter. The original colorway for the Elite series was Metallic Mach Purple/Total Orange. These colors were chosen to make it easier for players to spot each other on the field.

The Elite CTR360 was worn in the World Cup by many players, including Mario Balotelli, Carlos Tevez and Fabio Cannavaro.

Since the introduction of the Elite Series in May 2010, there has been an Elite version of every colorway of CTR except the current White/Silver/Purple.

Discontinuation
The successful line was ended by Nike when it announced its new silo, Magistas.  The replacing of CTR360 received a mixed reception.

See also
Nike Tiempo range, Nike’s ‘Touch’ boot
Nike Mercurial range, Nike’s ‘Speed’ boot
Nike Total 90 range, Nike’s ‘Power’ boot

References

Association football equipment
Nike brands
Sports footwear